Nachman Ash (born 1961) is an Israeli physician who is currently the director-general of the Ministry of Health.

Early life and education 
Nachman Ash was born in 1961.

Ash received his medical degree from the Sackler Faculty of Medicine at Tel Aviv University in 1986. In 1997, he completed a residency in internal medicine at the Sheba Medical Center.

Career 
Ash served as the chief of the Israel Defense Forces Medical Corps from 2007 to 2011.

Coronavirus 

Ash was appointed Israel's Coronavirus Commissioner by Prime Minister, Benjamin Netanyahu, on November 15, 2020, succeeding Ronni Gamzu.

In April 2021, Ash expressed concern that Israel did not have enough COVID-19 vaccines to provide its population with a third dose.

On June 28, 2021, Ash was announced as the next Director-General of the Ministry of Health, succeeding Chezy Levy.

References

External links 

1961 births
Living people
20th-century Israeli military personnel
20th-century Israeli physicians
21st-century Israeli civil servants
21st-century Israeli military personnel
21st-century Israeli physicians
Academic staff of Ariel University
Israeli generals
Israeli government officials
Israeli military doctors
Israeli surgeons
Jewish military personnel
People from Petah Tikva
Tel Aviv University alumni